MS 22, MS-22 or MS22 may refer to:

 Mississippi Highway 22 (MS 22), a state highway in central Mississippi, United States
 Soyuz MS-22, a Russian Soyuz crewed spaceflight to the ISS
 Progress MS-22, a Russian Progress cargo spaceflight to the ISS
 Minuscule 22 (MS22), Codex Colbertinus 2467, ε 288), a Greek minuscule manuscript of the New Testament

See also

 MS-2 (disambiguation)
 MS222 (disambiguation)